The Man from St. Petersburg is a thriller novel by Welsh writer Ken Follett, published in 1982.

Plot
The book is set just before the outbreak of World War I. It is an account of how the lives of the main characters were interwoven with the success or failure of secret naval talks between the United Kingdom of Great Britain and Ireland and the Russian Empire. In these, Britain had to win the support of Russia in order to make any headway with its navy. As a result, Tsar Nicholas’s nephew Prince Alexei was sent to London for high-level bilateral talks.

Lord Stephen Walden is married to Lydia, a Russian aristocrat. The young visiting Prince is her nephew and Walden was one of the people taking part in the talks. When Prince Alexei arrived in London, his presence aroused the interest of not only the establishment, but tragically that of Feliks, an anarchist.

Feliks, also a Russian, decided to assassinate Prince Alexei so that the Anglo-Russian negotiations would collapse. Having failed once to shoot the Russian prince, Feliks looked for alternative methods. Eventually, he learned that Lydia, his ex-lover, was married to Walden. He visited the Waldens’ home and was able to get details of the Prince’s whereabouts. But his plot was foiled when Lydia, guided by her intuition, realized that Feliks had evil designs and told her husband about Feliks’s visit.

As the drama unfolded, Walden’s daughter Charlotte got to know the effervescent Feliks. It was through her that he discovered once more about the hiding place of the Russian prince. It was about this time that Charlotte learned that her true father was not Walden, but Feliks. Lydia had been pregnant for two months before marrying Walden but this fact was unknown to Walden himself.

The story moved up to a crescendo with the Russian prince being hidden in the country home of the Waldens. Yet again, Feliks, the assassin, wheedled this piece information from Charlotte. With her active support, Feliks hid himself right in the Walden home while the Special Branch was combing the entire village for him.

At this point, Feliks decided it was time to make his move. He set the house on fire, which forced the prince to emerge to escape the flames. When the prince came out, Feliks shot him dead. But he himself lost his life in his attempt to save Charlotte who was trapped in the house by the inferno. When Walden later learnt of the paternity of Charlotte, he took it in his stride. For Feliks, it was a case of poetic justice.

In the final chapter, Winston Churchill - at the time First Lord of the Admiralty and having recent experience as Home Secretary - arrives on the scene and formulates a comprehensive plan for damage control: Disposing of Feliks' body, hiding that such a person ever existed and regretfully informing the Czar that his nephew died in the fire but had already signed the treaty. Thus - in common with the conventions of Secret History - the whole affair remains hidden from public scrutiny and the First World War breaks out on schedule, and goes on with its four years of mass bloodshed.

References

1982 British novels
Historical novels
British historical novels
British thriller novels
Novels by Ken Follett
Secret histories
Novels set during World War I
Novels set in the Russian Empire
Novels set in the United Kingdom
Cultural depictions of Nicholas II of Russia
Cultural depictions of Winston Churchill
Novels set in the 1910s
Hamish Hamilton books